The Merciful Lie (German: Die barmherzige Lüge) is a 1939 German drama film directed by Werner Klingler and starring Hilde Krahl, Elisabeth Flickenschildt and Ernst von Klipstein.

The film's sets were designed by the art directors Karl Böhm and Erich Czerwonski. It was shot at the Johannisthal Studios in Berlin and on location  in Bremen.

Synopsis
In a frontier town on the border between Manchuria and Mongolia Anja, the niece of the owner of a rough local entertainment venue, waits for the return of her lover Doctor Thomas Clausen with whom she has had a child. Clausen is part of an expedition planning to explore into the wild lands on the Soviet side of the border. To Anja's dismay, however, he returns with a new wife.

When the new wife dies of food poisoning and Clausen away on his expedition, Anja goes to Bremen to stay with his wealthy family and masquerades as his wife. They welcome her as has a child who will carry on the family line.

Cast
 Hilde Krahl  as Anja Hoster 
 Elisabeth Flickenschildt as Vera Holster 
 Ernst von Klipstein  as Dr.Thomas Clausen 
 Lieselott Klingler  as Maria, sua Moglie 
 Heinrich Schroth as Berthold Clausen 
 Agnes Windeck  as Margherita 
 Otto Gebühr  as Dr. Henrici 
 Paul Dahlke as Jean Goban 
 Gertrud Meyen  as Gerda Biehler, Sekretärin 
 Jaspar von Oertzen  as Felix 
 Olga Limburg  as Emilie Wallner 
 Ernst Albert Schaach  as Robert, Diener 
 Ekkehard Stibbe  as Thomas, Anjas Sohn 
 Lucie Euler  as Kinderfrau bei Anja 
 Nien Soen Ling as Diener 
 Thea Zien as Olga, Barmädchen 
 Max Paetz as Mongole im Hotel 
 Eugen von Bongardt  as Polizeioffizier 
 Franz Arzdorf  as 1. Kriminalkommissar 
 Georg A. Profé  as 2. Kriminalkommissar 
 Charly Berger as 1. Kriminalbeamter 
 Albert Probeck  as 2. Kriminalbeamter 
 Erik Radolf  as Kriminalrat 
 Eduard von Winterstein  as Professor Neumann 
 Willi Sande-Meyer as Dr. Fischer, Lawyer
 Ilse Trautschold as Mädchen bei Clausen 
 Fred Goebel  as Chauffeur bei Clausen 
 Curt Cappi  as Portier im Krankenhaus 
 Hanns Waschatko  as Deutscher Konsul 
 Else Lüders as Bridgepartnerin von Frau Wallner 
 Else Valery as Bridgepartnerin von Frau Wallner

References

Bibliography 
 Heins, Laura. Nazi Film Melodrama. University of Illinois Press, 2013.
 Waldman, Harry. Nazi Films in America, 1933–1942. McFarland, 2008.

External links 
 

1939 films
1939 drama films
German drama films
Films of Nazi Germany
1930s German-language films
Films directed by Werner Klingler
Films set in Mongolia
Tobis Film films
Films shot at Johannisthal Studios
1930s German films